The Whirlaway Handicap is a discontinued Thoroughbred horse race run at Washington Park Race Track in Chicago, Illinois. The event was first held on August 21, 1946, and had its final running on August 16, 1952.  Open to horses three years of age and older, the race on dirt was run as the Whirlaway Stakes from 1946 to 1951 and for 1952 as the Whirlaway Handicap.

In winning the 1949 race, Coaltown set a new world record for one mile on dirt while beating his Calumet Farm stablemate Ponder who on May 7 had won the 1949 Kentucky Derby.

Race distances:
 1 3/16 miles : 1952
 1 1/8 miles : 1946–1948, 1951 
 1 mile : 1949-1950

Winners

References

Discontinued horse races in the United States
Open middle distance horse races
Open mile category horse races
Horse races in Illinois
Washington Park Race Track
Recurring sporting events established in 1946
Recurring sporting events disestablished in 1952